Roisin Marcella Conaty (born 26 March 1979) is an English comedian, actress, and writer. She won the Best Newcomer Award at the Edinburgh Festival in 2010 for her show Hero, Warrior, Fireman, Liar. She played Jo in Channel 4 sitcom Man Down from 2013 to 2017. In early 2014, the pilot of the sitcom GameFace, of which she is the writer, lead actress and executive producer, aired on Channel 4. The first full series aired in 2017 on both E4 and Hulu in the US. The second series aired on Channel 4 and Hulu in July 2019. Conaty won the Heat magazine's "Unmissables Comedian of the Year" award in 2019. She played Roxy in the first two series of the Netflix comedy-drama series After Life.

Early life
Roisin Marcella Conaty was born in the Camden area of London on 26 March 1979, the daughter of Irish parents. Her mother was a nurse from Dromcolliher, County Limerick, while her father was an Aer Lingus employee from Virginia, County Cavan. She grew up in Camden with her younger sister, Siobhan, and spent summers in Ireland. She studied film at Middlesex University and had several office jobs before starting her comedy career at the age of 24.

Career

Comedy
In 2010, Conaty won the Best Newcomer Award at the Edinburgh Festival for her show Hero, Warrior, Fireman, Liar. In April 2011, she performed her show at the Melbourne Comedy Festival. She followed that show up with Lifehunter in 2013.

In November 2010, she appeared on series 3, episode 4 of Russell Howard's Good News. Other stand-up performances include "The Angina Monologues", alongside Victoria Wood, Jo Brand, Andi Osho, Isy Suttie and Katy Brand for Sky Television, Russell Howard's Stand Up Central on Comedy Central and Live at the Apollo in December 2015. In 2016, she was a guest on the Jonathan Ross Show.

Conaty has appeared on a number of panel shows, including Have I Got News for You, 8 Out of 10 Cats Does Countdown, Insert Name Here, A League of Their Own, Would I Lie to You?, Hypothetical, and Room 101. She starred in the BBC Three version of Impractical Jokers. She was one of the original cast of comedians in series 1 of Taskmaster on Dave. Taskmaster creator and co-host Alex Horne said that she was "the worst. But also one of my favourites."

Conaty appeared on the Big Fat Quiz Of Everything on 7 January 2021 on a team with Rob Beckett.

Acting
Conaty played Jo in the Channel 4 sitcom Man Down, alongside Greg Davies, from 2013 to 2017; and appeared in Ricky Gervais' film David Brent: Life on the Road.

In 2014, she wrote and starred in the pilot of her sitcom GameFace, in which she plays a struggling actress named Marcella. The pilot aired on Channel 4 in April 2014, following which a full series was commissioned, which premiered on E4 in October 2017. The second series debuted in July 2019 with critical acclaim.

In March 2019, she featured in the Netflix comedy-drama series After Life as Daphne/Roxy.

Filmography

Film

Television

References

External links
 
 

1979 births
Living people
20th-century English actresses
20th-century English comedians
21st-century English actresses
21st-century English comedians
Actresses from London
British stand-up comedians
Comedians from London
English comedy writers
English film actresses
English people of Irish descent
English television actresses
English women comedians
People from Camden Town